The G15 is an organisation of the largest housing associations in and around Greater London in the United Kingdom, which collectively are responsible for managing in the region of 600,000 homes in London. They state their purpose as "working to solve the housing crisis by delivering good quality, affordable homes of all types".

In February 2023, the G15 group confirmed that Fiona Fletcher-Smith, group CEO of L&Q, has been appointed as the network’s chair. The moves came after confirmation that current vice-chair Richard Hill (CEO of One Housing), will be joining BPHA as its new head in April.

Membership
The G15 originally had 15 members, but some of them have since merged. 
The current members are:

References

External links
 
  A snapshot of the G15 in 2009.

Housing organisations based in London
Housing associations based in England